Sandro Caldini is an Italian oboist and the brother of the Italian composer Fulvio Caldini, whose works he frequently performs.

In addition to the oboe, Caldini also plays the oboe d'amore and cor anglais.

External links
Conservatory of Udine bio

Italian classical oboists
Male oboists
Cor anglais players
Year of birth missing (living people)
Contemporary classical music performers
Living people
Place of birth missing (living people)